The Mushroom Cloud Effect is a street album by Pakistani hip-hop artist Adil Omar consisting of compiled tracks and previously unheard demos. It was released digitally on March 22, 2013 and features Omar's early underground work (mostly affiliated with Soul Assassins) performing on other producer's tracks as opposed to self produced material.

Track listing

References

2013 albums
Adil Omar albums